The Chinese Ambassador to Antigua and Barbuda is the official representative of the People's Republic of China to Antigua and Barbuda.

List of representatives

References 

Ambassadors of China to Antigua and Barbuda
Antigua and Barbuda
China|Antigua and Barbuda